The Port of Spain International Waterfront Centre is a construction project aimed at revitalising and transforming the waterfront of the capital-city Port of Spain located in Trinidad and Tobago. The project is a part of the overall Vision 2020, a government policy attempting to take Trinidad and Tobago to developed country status by 2020. That policy has since been shelved. The towers, which were supposed to usher in the beginning of a "Financial Centre" never materialized, and have slowly been occupied by government departments and offices.

The master plan involves constructing two 26-story office towers, a 22-story Hyatt Regency Hotel, and the English-speaking Caribbean region's largest conference centre. It was completed in 2009.

The location of the complex is #1 Wrightson Road, Port of Spain.

References

External links
Vision2020 - Infrastructure and Environment
Urban Development Corporation Of Trinidad And Tobago - The Port of Spain International Waterfront Centre

Hyatt Hotels and Resorts
Convention centers in Trinidad and Tobago
Skyscrapers in Trinidad and Tobago
Buildings and structures in Port of Spain
Redeveloped ports and waterfronts